The   Ministry of Agriculture (Kr̥ṣi mantraṇālaẏa) is a ministry of Bangladesh. The ministry is the apex body for formulation and administration of the rules, regulations and laws related to Agriculture in Bangladesh.

Directorate/ Agency

Agriculture Information Service (AIS)
Department of Agricultural Marketing
Department of Agricultural Extension
National Agriculture Training Academy (NATA)
National Institute of Biotechnology
Cotton Development Board
Barind Multipurpose Development Authority
Bangladesh Agricultural Development Corporation
Bangladesh Agricultural Research Institute
Bangladesh Agricultural Research Council
Bangladesh Sugarcrop Research Institute (BSRI)
Bangladesh Rice Research Institute
Bangladesh Institute of Nuclear Agriculture
Bangladesh Jute Research Institute (BJRI)
Bangladesh Institute of Research and Training on Applied Nutrition (BIRTAN)
Soil Resource Development Institute (SRDI)
SAARC Agricultural Information Centre (SAC)
Seed Certification Agency
Horticulture Export Development Foundation (Hortex Foundation)
Bangladesh Wheat and Maize Research Institute (BWMRI)

References

 
Agriculture
Agricultural organisations based in Bangladesh
Bangladesh